The 1986 Preakness Stakes was the 111th running of the Preakness Stakes thoroughbred horse race. The race took place on May 17, 1986, and was televised in the United States on the ABC television network. Snow Chief, who was jockeyed by Alex Solis, won the race by four lengths over runner-up Ferdinand.  Approximate post time was 5:41 p.m. Eastern Time. The race was run over a fast track in a final time of 1:54-4/5. The Maryland Jockey Club reported total attendance of 87,652, this is recorded as second highest on the list of American thoroughbred racing top attended events for North America in 1986.

Payout 

The 111th Preakness Stakes Payout Schedule

$2 Exacta:  (3–5) paid  $33.80

The full chart 

 Winning Breeder: Blue Diamond Ranch; (CA)
 Winning Time: 1:54 4/5
 Track Condition: Fast
 Total Attendance: 87,652

See also 

 1986 Kentucky Derby

References

External links 

 

1986
1986 in horse racing
1986 in American sports
1986 in sports in Maryland
Horse races in Maryland